Clarence E."Toar" Springstein (December 11, 1918 – before 2006) was a Canadian football player who played for the Saskatchewan Roughriders. In 1990, he was included on the Roughriders' Plaza of Honour.

References

1918 births
Players of Canadian football from Saskatchewan
Saskatchewan Roughriders players
Sportspeople from Regina, Saskatchewan
Year of death missing